The 1953 Swiss Grand Prix was a Formula Two race held on 23 August 1953 at Bremgarten Circuit. It was race 8 of 9 in the 1953 World Championship of Drivers, which was run to Formula Two rules in 1952 and 1953, rather than the Formula One regulations normally used. World Champion Ferrari driver Alberto Ascari won the race.

The race marked the brief return of Grand Prix-era legend Hermann Lang. He was given a chance to participate in Formula 1 racing driving for Officine Alfieri Maserati after one of their team drivers was injured. He raced in two World Drivers' Championship events overall—one in 1953 and one in 1954—and his result here, a fifth-place finish, was his best result.

Classification

Qualifying

Race 

Notes
 – Includes 1 point for fastest lap

Shared drives
 (Fangio and Bonetto switched cars)
 Car #32: Fangio (12 laps) then Bonetto (52 laps). They shared the points for 4th place.
 Car #30: Bonetto (12 laps) then Fangio (17 laps)

Championship standings after the race 
Drivers' Championship standings

Note: Only the top five positions are included. Only the best 4 results counted towards the Championship. Numbers without parentheses are Championship points; numbers in parentheses are total points scored.

References

Swiss Grand Prix
Swiss Grand Prix
Grand Prix
Swiss Grand Prix